The 1920 United States presidential election in Vermont took place on November 2, 1920, as part of the 1920 United States presidential election which was held throughout all contemporary 48 states. Voters chose four representatives, or electors to the Electoral College, who voted for president and vice president. 

Vermont voted overwhelmingly for the Republican nominee, Ohio Senator Warren G. Harding, over the Democratic nominee, Ohio Governor James M. Cox. Harding ran with Massachusetts Governor Calvin Coolidge, while Cox ran with Assistant Secretary of the Navy Franklin D. Roosevelt of New York. 

Harding won in a massive landslide, taking 75.82% of the vote, while Cox took 23.25%, a Republican victory margin of 52.57%.

Vermont historically was a bastion of liberal Northeastern Republicanism, and by 1920 the Green Mountain State had gone Republican in every presidential election since the founding of the Republican Party. From 1856 to 1916, Vermont had had the longest streak of voting Republican of any state, having never voted Democratic before, and this tradition easily continued amidst the nationwide Republican landslide in 1920. 

Harding was also helped in the state by the local popularity of his running mate, Calvin Coolidge, a traditional New England Yankee born in the small-town of Plymouth Notch, Vermont, who had started his political career nearby as Governor of Massachusetts. 

Harding swept every county in Vermont by landslide margins, taking more than sixty percent of the vote in all fourteen. Harding broke seventy percent of the vote in eleven counties, and even broke eighty percent in five. 

Vermont would be the third most Republican state in the union in terms of victory margin, and the second most Republican state in terms of vote share after North Dakota. Vermont would weigh in as over 26% more Republican than the national average in the 1920 election.

Results

Results by county

See also
 United States presidential elections in Vermont

References

Vermont
1920
1920 Vermont elections